The Government Documents Round Table (GODORT) is an American Library Association membership group that provides a forum for discussing issues and sharing ideas around government information.

See also 
 Federal depository library

References

External links 
 GODORT Homepage

American Library Association
United States government information